This is an incomplete list of songs released by American punk rock group the Offspring in alphabetical order. The list includes tracks from each of the Offspring's studio albums The Offspring (1989), Ignition (1992), Smash (1994), Ixnay on the Hombre (1997), Americana (1998), Conspiracy of One (2000), Splinter (2003), Rise and Fall, Rage and Grace (2008), Days Go By (2012) and Let the Bad Times Roll (2021). It also includes the tracks from the compilation albums Greatest Hits (2005) and Happy Hour! (2010), as well as the two EPs Baghdad (1991) and Club Me (1997) and tracks that the band had recorded prior to 1989. Bonus tracks from studio albums, B-sides and tracks from various artists compilation albums and soundtracks are also listed here.

See also
 The Offspring discography

Notes

The Offspring songs
Offspring, The